Cizrespor is a sports club located in Cizre, a Kurdish populated city in the province of Şırnak, Turkey.

Cizrespor was founded in 1972 and closed in 2010. Cizre Basraspor was founded in 2010 and adopted the name Cizrespor later on. After  its foundation, the club started competing in Mardin amateur leagues. In 2014–15 season, they became the champions and promoted to the Third League again.

In September 2014, Serge Djiéhoua signed for Cizrespor because he thought it was the Süper Lig team, Çaykur Rizespor. When he arrived at the airport, he was surprised to be greeted by Cizrespor fans instead of Rizespor fans. It was the moment he realized he signed for the wrong team. He left the club after the 2014 Kobanî protests.

In 2014–15 Turkish Cup, they managed to beat Göztepe to be the first amateur team in competition history to reach the group stage.

In February 2020 the club announced that they would withdraw from competing in the TFF Third League due to racist treatment from the referees.

Honours 

 TFF Third League

 Winners (1): 1999-00

References

External links
Cizrespor on TFF.org

 
Association football clubs established in 2010
Sport in Şırnak
Football clubs in Turkey
2010 establishments in Turkey